"Ball and Chain" is a song co-written and recorded by American country music artist Paul Overstreet.  It was released in June 1991 as the third single from his album Heroes. The song reached #5 on the Billboard Hot Country Singles & Tracks chart in October 1991.  It was written by Overstreet and Don Schlitz.

Chart performance

Year-end charts

References

1991 singles
1991 songs
Paul Overstreet songs
Songs written by Paul Overstreet
Songs written by Don Schlitz
RCA Records singles
Song recordings produced by Brown Bannister